Belize competed at the 2012 Summer Olympics in London, which were held from 27 July to 12 August 2012. The country's participation in London was its eleventh appearance in the Summer Olympics since its debut at the 1968 Summer Olympics. The delegation included two short-distance runners and one judoka: Kenneth Medwood, Kaina Martinez and Eddermys Sanchez. Medwood qualified by recording a time that met qualification standards while the latter two entered through wildcard places. Medwood was selected as the flag bearer for both the opening and closing ceremonies. Medwood reached the semifinals of the men's 400 metres hurdles before he was eliminated from competition while Martinez did not progress farther than the quarterfinal stage of the women's 100 metres. Sanchez was defeated by his opponent Miklós Ungvári of Hungary in a 19-second match in the Round of 32 of the men's half-lightweight judo competition.

Background 
Belize participated in eleven Summer Olympic Games between its debut at the 1968 Summer Olympics in Mexico City and the 2012 Summer Olympics in London, England, with the exception of the 1980 Summer Olympics in the Soviet Union because the country joined the United States-led boycott over the 1979 invasion of Afghanistan during the Soviet–Afghan War. Belize participated in the London Summer Olympics from 27 July to 12 August 2012. The nation's delegation was composed of sprinters Kenneth Medwood and Kaina Martinezs and judoka Eddermys Sanchez. The trio were announced by the Belize Olympic & Commonwealth Games Association on 21 February 2012, and were selected from athletes in ten sports. Along with the three athletes, the delegation consisted of chef de mission Owen Sonny Meighan, attaché Andrew Wingmore, delegate Josephine Flowers, coaches Colin Thurton and Wellington Chee, and Thomas Searle, the team's doctor. Medwood was selected as the flag bearer for both the opening and closing ceremonies.

Athletics 

Kenneth Medwood was the youngest person to represent Belize at the London Games at age 24. He had not participated in any previous Olympic Games. Medwood qualified for the Games because his fastest time of 49.54 seconds, recorded at the Mt. San Antonio College in April 2012, was 0.26 seconds quicker the "B" qualifying standard for his event, the men's 400 metres hurdles. He competed in the event's first heat on 3 August, finishing fourth out of eight athletes, with a time of 49.78 seconds. Medwood's performance allowed him to qualify for the contest's semifinal stage as the fastest losing runner. In the semifinals the following day, he placed fifth out of eight runners, with a time of 49.87 seconds. Overall he finished 17th out of 46 runners, and did not advance to the final after finishing 1.92 seconds slower than the slowest qualifier. After his event, Medwood told Great Belize Television that the games were "a great experience" which were something she had anticipated but that "it was an experience in itself because I've never been to the Games."

At the age of 26, Kaina Martinez was the sole female athlete on the Belize Olympic team. She made her first appearance in the Olympic Games. Martinez qualified for the London Games because her quickest time of 11.74 seconds, set at the 2011 Central American Championships in Athletics, was 0.36 seconds slower than the "B" qualifying standard for her contest, the women's 100 metres. Before the Games she stated that she felt satisfied and attempted not to get excessive anxiety by relaxing and mediating. Martinez was drawn in the second heat in the event's preliminary stage, finishing second out of eight runners, with a time of 11.81 seconds. Her time allowed her to qualify for the first round. Overall Martinez ranked 51st out of 78 athletes and failed to go through to the semifinal after finishing 0.81 seconds slower than the slowest qualifier in round one. Afterwards she said: "It's an awesome experience. I mean words can really describe honestly how I feel being here and being a part of the competition. I just think it's an awesome experience."

 Men

 Women

Judo 

Eddermys Sanchez Machado represented Belize in men's judo. He qualified by being awarded an invitational place by the Tripartite Commission in June 2012. Sanchez took part in the men's half-lightweight judo (66 kg) competition, which included athletes under 66 kilograms in weight. He was the oldest person to represent Belize at the London Games at the age of 32, and made his debut in the Olympic movement. Sanchez faced Miklós Ungvári of Hungary in the Round of 32 after receiving a bye and was defeated by his opponent after 19 seconds and therefore eliminated from the competition.

Notes

References 

Nations at the 2012 Summer Olympics
2012
2012 in Belizean sport